Inside Trader: The Authentic Stock Trading Game is a 1987 video game published by Cosmi Corporation.

Gameplay
Inside Trader: The Authentic Stock Trading Game is a game in which players are given $30,000 dollars in seed money in a simulated securities environment.

Reception
Jasper Sylvester reviewed the game for Computer Gaming World, and stated that "Inside Trader is fun, fast, and fascinating, but it is not "The Authentic Stock Trading Game" it is billed as. Nevertheless, it is interesting enough for prospective stock market manipulators of simulated securities environments to pay attention to."

Reviews
ASM (Aktueller Software Markt) - Nov, 1988
The Games Machine - Nov, 1988
ACE (Advanced Computer Entertainment) - Nov, 1988

References

External links
Review in Computer Games Week

1987 video games
Business simulation games
Cosmi Corporation games
DOS games
DOS-only games
Video games developed in the United States